Tapering may mean:

Tapering (sports)
Tapering (signal processing)
Tapering (mathematics)
Tapering (economics)
Opioid tapering, reduction in opioid dose over time